An alternate ending (or alternative ending) is an ending of a story that was considered, or even written or produced, but ultimately discarded in favour of another resolution. Generally, alternative endings are considered to have no bearing on the canonical narrative.

Examples in literature
 Charles Dickens' novel Great Expectations originally had a bleaker conclusion, with Pip meeting Estella, but after she remarried. In a letter, Dickens stated that he had been persuaded by Edward Bulwer-Lytton to change it prior to publication.
 Ernest Hemingway struggled with the ending of A Farewell to Arms. By his count, he wrote 39 of them "before I was satisfied." However, a 2012 edition of the book included 47 alternative endings.
 Robert A. Heinlein originally killed off the protagonist of Podkayne of Mars, but grudgingly let her live in response to his publisher's objections.
 John Green tied one of the characters to railway tracks in his second draft of The Fault in Our Stars to explore the trolley problem. He also wrote an ending in which Hazel and Van Houten die in a shootout with a drug lord.
 Felix Salten's The Hound of Florence differs greatly in the original German language (Der Hund von Florenz) and in the English translation. The German-language version ends in tragedy: the archduke stabs the dog to death, killing Lukas, and his body is disposed of. In the English translation, a wholly new ending of six more pages has been written: Lukas survives, gets medication and is united with the courtesan. Currently it is not known if the alternative ending is authorized.

Examples in movies
Alternative endings are often filmed before being scrapped, and may be subsequently included as a special feature in the film's DVD release. These alternative endings are a special type of deleted scene. In other cases, ideas that were presented but discarded early on are alluded to by the production team in commentary or interviews.

Some movies also present the alternative ending on International releases as well as their international Home media release, with its original region release only showing the alternative ending on certain TV channels.

The following are examples of known alternative endings to movies:
Harikrishnans: In the 1998 Indian Malayalam Film Harikrishnans, the director used two climaxes to please the fans of both the lead actors, Mammootty and Mohanlal.
1408: An alternative ending is present on the director's cut disc (much like The Butterfly Effect, with a few deleted scenes reinserted) Mike Enslin dies in the fire he causes. At his burial, his wife is approached by the hotel manager, offering his personal belongings. She refuses, and he lets her know that her husband did not die in vain. Back in his vehicle he listens to the tape recorder, and screams in fear as he sees Enslin's burned deformed body in his back seat for only a moment. The film closes with an apparition of Mike Enslin still in 1408, muttering to himself, hears his daughter's voice, and finally exiting the room with her.
28 Days Later: Several darker alternative endings (filmed, available on the DVD release). The first has Jim gravely injured near the end of the film and he is taken to a hospital, but he dies before he can be given medical attention, and his body is left behind (completing a cycle in the movie; he woke up alone in a hospital and has now died there). Some versions also involve him dreaming of the accident that put him in the hospital at the beginning of the film. Another unfilmed ending picks up after Frank has been infected, where they take him to a research complex and Jim sacrifices his own life to give him a total blood transfusion to restore him, and he is once again left alone in a hospital bed. This was discarded for being too unbelievable.
3 Ninjas: The American cut originally showed that the boys had won the basketball challenge and effortlessly won Emily's bike back. In an extended international version of this movie, they lose the basketball challenge along with their own bikes, so a scene ends the international version of the film in which they fight the bullies to get them back, as an alternative ending. In the United States, this alternative ending can only be seen on certain television channels such as Starz, Showtime and Showtime MAX; international DVDs have this version, as well.
Army of Darkness: In an alternative ending after Ash drinks the potion that would make him sleep long enough to wake up in his own time, he inadvertently drinks too much and wakes up in the future in a ruined city. Realizing that the world is a post-apocalyptic wasteland, Ash screams "I slept too long!"
The Astronaut's Wife: When Spencer is killed, Jillian is not possessed by the alien. Instead, she moves out to the country. Sitting beneath a tree, looking up at the stars, she tunes her radio to the same signals Spencer was receiving while possessed by the alien - her twin babies controlling her movements from inside the womb, listening - and waiting...
Blade: Trinity: The original ending is far more ambiguous with Dracula and Blade's fates not as determined. The ending only appears in the unrated DVD and was intended by the director David S. Goyer. Another alternative ending was seen showing Hannibal King and Abigail Whistler confront a werewolf.
The Bourne Identity: An alternative ending on the DVD has Jason Bourne collapsing during the search for Marie, waking up with Abbot standing over him, and getting an offer to return to the CIA. The ending was filmed after the studio became concerned that the film's treatment of American foreign policy and the intelligence community would be perceived as anti-American following the September 11 attacks. 
The Butterfly Effect: Evan watches a home video of his mother pregnant with him and returns to the memory of himself as a fetus. Convinced that his very existence has ruined the lives of those around him, he strangles himself with his umbilical cord and dies, stillborn. This "Director's Cut" ending is much darker than the theatrical ending, where he simply stops himself from becoming friends with Kayleigh.
Cats & Dogs: Mr. Tinkles has been taken to her sisters by Sophie the Maid.
Child's Play 2: An extended ending reveals that a chunk of Chucky's skin after his head exploded got mixed in with the Good Guy doll making plaster. A machine is then seen making a new Good Guy Doll head, which then forms a sinister smile.
Clash of the Titans: After defeating the Kraken and Hades, Andromeda falls into the sea and Perseus dives in to save her. When he reaches her, he embraces her with a passionate kiss, indicating that he fell in love with her, and she with him. After reaching the shore and regaining consciousness, Andromeda asks Perseus if he will stay and he says there is someone he needs to talk to, before kissing her again, indicating that he will come back. Getting on Pegasus, he flies to Mount Olympus (although the special effects are incomplete) where he confronts Zeus, stating that he does not wish to be one of them and that any conflict between them has just started. After slamming his sword into the gods' map and shattering the models of every living person, he leaves and is seen flying on Pegasus over the sea, presumably back to Argos (although the special effects are incomplete).
Clerks: Dante is still inside the Quick Stop after it closes. A customer enters and, without saying a word, shoots Dante after he tells him they are closed, and empties the cash register. The credits then roll, and when they are over a customer comes in and steals cigarettes without noticing Dante's body on the ground behind the counter.
Clue had four different endings, and each one distributed to theatres had one of three of them. The video and DVD version had all of these three endings on it. The fourth one has not been included because the director did not approve of it.
Die Hard with a Vengeance: In an alternative ending found on the special edition DVD it is presumed that Simon's robbery of the Federal Reserve succeeds, with Simon smuggling the gold out of the country disguised as Empire State Building statuettes and McClane taking the blame for the failure to stop the robbery. McClane locates  Gruber months later in a bar in Hungary, and invites to play a game called "McClane Says". This involves a form of Russian Roulette with a small Chinese rocket launcher with the sights removed, meaning it cannot be determined which end is which. McClane then asks Gruber some riddles similar to the ones he played in New York. When Gruber gets a riddle wrong, McClane forces him at gunpoint to fire the launcher, which blows Gruber to bits. This ending is in the novelization, only McClane fools Gruber into thinking the tube-like launcher is pointed at McClane. Gruber guesses the trick question and shoots himself.
Diary of a Wimpy Kid 2: Rodrick Rules: Greg finds out Rodrick told the story of how he got stuck in the lady's room at Lesure Towers to his friends, and his friends told their family and friends and so on. But when he comes to school, everyone is congratulating him, figuring out someone messed up and exaggerated the story.
Dodgeball: A True Underdog Story: The Average Joes lose the game when White Goodman hits Peter with the ball. According to the DVD commentary, this was the writer's original intention for the movie, but the studio insisted it be changed - hence the "real" ending - when test audiences reacted poorly to the unhappy ending. (The antagonist references this right at the end of the movie, by mocking the audience for wanting a happy ending and saying, "You happy now?")
Ella Enchanted: The movie was originally supposed to end in a scene after the wedding, where Hattie is turned into a frog by Lucinda, Ella's father demands a divorce from Dame Olga, Heston is still alive but suffering torment from the Char Fan Club, Slannen becomes a lawyer, and Dame Olga ends up with Nish. The  scene was cut and replaced with a musical ending with the entire cast present, and they exit like they do on stage.
Ernest Goes To Jail: The network broadcast version of the film included an extra scene where the bank guards demonstrate a computerized security system to the branch manager while Ernest is seen working as a bank clerk (his dream job in the film). The movie concludes when Ernest's computer shocks him and 2 file cabinets move toward him.
Fatal Attraction: Alex Forrest (Glenn Close) was originally scripted to commit suicide at the end of the movie and make it look like Dan (Michael Douglas) had murdered her, for which he was arrested. Test audiences did not respond well to this finale, mainly due to a lack of revenge from Beth and the family, especially when Beth tells Alex "If you ever come near my family again, I'll kill you". This resulted in a three-week re-shoot for the action-filled sequence in the bathroom and Alex's death by shooting. The fact that Beth shoots Alex makes a direct comparison between the two characters, Alex being a victim, and Beth taking control to protect her family.
Final Destination: Alex is killed when he grabs the downed power line to save Claire, ending Death's pattern. In the final scene it turns out that Claire is pregnant with Alex's baby.
Final Destination 2: The original movie was supposed to end with Kimberly and Officer Burke embracing in the hospital after Kimberly is revived. Instead, David Ellis, the director, decided to end the film with a bang and include the barbecue scene.
Final Destination 3: The film has two alternative endings (based on the viewer's choices on the DVD). In the first ending, Ian is fully crushed by the sign and Wendy, Kevin, and Julie decide what to do next. In the second ending, which involves the subway, the train headed for Wendy actually hits her, instead of being a vision.
The Final Destination: In one alternative ending, Nick realizes he has to kill himself for the chain to end. So, he puts out the initial fire and then jumps out a window, killing himself. Later, Janet and Lori sadly embrace, as Lori says, "The chain is broken." Suddenly, a piece of the chain holding the A/C unit breaks and lands next to Lori. Lori picks it up, and the unit drops and crushes Lori and Janet, with Lori's hand holding the chain sliding into the audience's face in 3D. In another, Nick is also crushed with Lori in the escalator, instead of it being a vision.
Final Destination 5: In an alternative ending, which was in the original script, Sam, Molly and Nathan take a walk through memorial park believing they finally cheated Death but Death is still in action after Nathan is crushed by Flight 180's landing gear while Sam and Molly stare at him in horror.
First Blood: In an alternative ending, John Rambo commits suicide rather than be arrested. This ending is included as an extra on the First Blood Ultimate Edition DVD released in 2004.
Friday the 13th Part III: Chris wakes up the morning after killing Jason Voorhees, only to find he is still alive when she opens the back door of the lake house. Jason then proceeds to cut off Chris's head, and the scene immediately switches to Chris waking up screaming in the back of the police car, revealing her entire death was a dream and Jason remains dead in the barn.
Friday the 13th: The Final Chapter: An alternative ending to the film, included in the 2009 Deluxe Edition DVD, shows a dream sequence where Trish and Tommy wake up the next morning after killing Jason to the sound of police sirens. Trish sends Tommy to summon the police who have arrived next door. At that point she notices water dripping from the ceiling and goes to investigate. She enters the upstairs bathroom, and finds the body of her mother, drowned in the bathtub. At that moment, Mrs. Jarvis' eyes open and Jason appears behind Trish, ready to strike. Trish then suddenly wakes up in the hospital in a scene reminiscent of the ending of the first movie. In his commentary, the director says this scene was cut because it interfered with the idea that this would be the final film.
Game of Death: This movie has two alternative endings. In the Hong Kong Cantonese print, after we see Billy defeating Dr. Land, who falls from the rooftop, the police and an ambulance arrives there. The police arrest Billy and the ambulance takes Dr. Land. In the Mandarin print it shows that after defeating Dr. Land, Billy is with Ann at a harbor, saying good-bye to Jim. The next scene shows a ship departing and a picture of Bruce Lee. This scene of the ship departing is also in the Hong Kong ending.
Happy Death Day: An alternative ending has Tree recovering in the hospital from her ordeal with Lori, while being visited by her father and Carter. After they leave, a nurse enters to administer pain medication to Tree, with Tree stating that it was against doctor's orders. The nurse later reveals herself as Stephanie Butler, the wife of Dr. Gregory Butler, and she later kills Tree out of revenge for her affair with Gregory.
Hide and Seek: This movie had many different endings on whether Dakota Fanning's character, Emily had split personality and whether she ended up at a mental hospital or at a new home.
I Am Legend: The "Monster Woman" that Robert Neville captures in order to run a "cure" test becomes the key to his survival in the end. As the "Alpha Monster" begins to break into the lab area, he stops, and Robert Neville suddenly realizes that all they want is the "Monster Woman" back. So Robert Neville rolls her out of the lab and awakens her out of her medicated state, and the "Alpha Monster" picks her up and takes her away, leaving Neville alive after his ordeal.
I Know What You Did Last Summer: In the alternative ending, Julie receives an invite to a pool party and reads an email that reads "I still know". This scene was used in the trailer for the film.
Infernal Affairs: In the mainland Chinese version, the police found evidence proving Lau Kin Ming (Andy Lau) is a triad mole and is arrested and the film end. The sequel, Infernal Affairs III, follows the original Hong Kong ending where Lau got away with his crime.
Little Shop of Horrors: In one of the most famous changed endings, the original conclusion to the off-Broadway musical was filmed and preferred by the director Frank Oz and the majority of the actors. However, test audiences disliked how Audrey and Seymour, the main protagonists, were both killed by the evil alien plant, and the ending had to be re-shot so that their deaths were removed.
Men in Black II: The original ending for the film featured a scene in which the towers of the World Trade Center opened to release a swarm of UFOs. After the terrorist attacks in 2001, the ending was reshot.
 Orphan: In an alternative ending, Esther is seen hurrying into her room. There, she is shown with a face covered in blood while she re-applies her makeup. She then puts on the dress she wore for her first day of school and greets the police, who arrived after receiving Kate's frantic call before she reached the house, at the top of the stairs by curtsying and introducing herself, and then she is seen descending the stairs into the crowd of police. It is not explained whether or not she has killed Kate or Max in the alternative ending, although the dead body of John can be seen. However, due to the excess blood on Esther's face in the alternative ending and the fact that she is not wet, it is a possibility that she killed both Max and Kate.
Paranormal Activity: In one version of the film that was shown at only one public viewing, Katie returns to the bedroom after the screaming and noise of her and Micah struggling downstairs. She is holding a knife and covered in blood. She closes and locks the bedroom door. Katie walks over and smiles at the camera, then slits her own throat. There is a third ending in which, after killing Micah, Katie returns to the bedroom and sits down against the bed with the knife in her hand, rocking back and forth, for almost two days straight. Katie's sister comes looking for her, but when she enters the house, she is heard screaming after seeing Micah's body. The creature possessing Katie leaves her body, and scares Katie's sister out of the house, before returning to Katie, who resumes rocking back and forth. The police arrive at the house about 30 minutes later, and Katie comes out of the bedroom with her knife, calling for Micah. Following a heated confrontation, a door behind the officers slams shut, causing the officers to shoot Katie.
Paycheck: Jennings and Rachel are wondering what to do next when Jennings spots the kid who stole the engagement ring from him on the subway coming out of a pawn shop. He goes into the shop for a few minutes and when he comes back he asks Rachel "do you believe in fate?" and they kiss. It is assumed he then proposes to her because it fades to black at that point.
Pineapple Express: Both main characters are killed off by a man they forgot to shoot down.
Rocky Balboa: Rocky defeats Mason "The Line" Dixon by split decision. In the actual movie, it is reversed.
Ronin: Deirdre is seen on the stairs next to the café considering joining Sam and Vincent. Deciding against it, she walks up the stairs. As she is getting into her car, she is snatched into a van by men in the IRA who call her a traitor. It is implied that she is later killed. Sam and Vincent finish their conversation and depart, completely unaware of what has just happened.
Scream 3: When Ghostface enters the screening room, he does not have a white sheet covering him. After Roman notices Sidney Prescott has disappeared after he supposedly killed her, he searches the screening room for her shouting and telling her all the doors are locked, most of the scene shows Sidney's point of view which was not shown in the actual ending. Also, Kincaid does not enter the screening room in this ending.
Scary Movie 3: Cindy is told Cody does not exist. After hitting a few people in the face with a shovel, Cindy asks everybody who is not real to stand a specific spot. Cody goes there, and is followed by Santa Claus. The aliens then begin to invade but George stops them by transforming into The Hulk. President Harris tries to hulk out, but ends up soiling his pants. Cindy enters the Logan House, where she is attacked by Tabitha. She is teleported away to Aunt Shaneequa, who teaches her how to defeat Tabitha. Cindy must then confront hundreds of Tabithas. She wins the battle by performing moves from The Matrix and teleports back to the Logan House. The cast then gets into a car with the President, but are horrified to learn that the driver happens to be M. Night Shyamalan.
Seven: Writer, Andrew Kevin Walker, completed two separate drafts of the ending. The first was used in the theatrical edition of the film. In the second, John Doe is killed by Somerset instead of Mills. This alternative ending sequence was storyboarded and is included in the published script, but never filmed, however it does appear on an extra disk on the DVD Release.
Sliver: Carly Norris and the killer fly over a volcano when the killer suddenly confesses his crimes. He then veers the aircraft into the volcano as the end credits roll and leaves the audience to decide whether they survive.
Smokin' Aces: Rather than pulling the life support cords of Israel and Sparazza as he does in the used ending, he instead draws his weapon and empties his pistol into them.
Super Troopers: Another ending was filmed that starts the same way as the real ending; by the police station being closed down. This time, the former officers are now working in a meat packing plant. They talk to their boss saying that bad meat should not be sent out for people to buy, and the boss says to do it any way. At this point the officers take off their jacket to reveal that they are now local police officers and chase him throughout the meat packing plant.
Swordfish: The DVD version contains an alternative ending wherein Ginger is told in the bank that the account is already empty, alluding to the possibility that Stanley has played one final trick on them and taken the money himself. In a companion scene to the alternative ending, Stanley is shown on a trip with his daughter in a brand new RV. While eating at a diner, Stanley is shown transferring many billion dollars to various charities before continuing his trip.
The Terminator: The alternative ending, included in some DVD releases, shows the cleanup and police response at the factory shortly after the final battle between Kyle and the terminator. A group of company representatives find the terminator wreckage and decide to hide it from police and have it analyzed. The film then ends by the screen panning out to show that the factory was owned by Cyberdyne Systems. The sequel is based on this alternative ending.
Terminator 2: Judgment Day: The alternative ending shows Sarah Connor alive and well on August 29, 2029. She is by then a grandmother (and John Connor is a Senator) in a world where Skynet was never able to start its war on humanity.
Titanic: Old Rose is seen by her granddaughter dropping the "Heart of the Ocean" diamond into the ocean.
Topaz: While Nicole and Michèle waiting in front of Stade Charléty, there was a duel between André and Jacques in the French football stadium. Jacques is shot down by a sniper. This ending was poorly received by audiences during test screenings.
X-Men: The Last Stand: Not only different endings were intended to use in this film, but nearly a whole different plot, significantly the role of Jean Grey being more aggressive and disobeying direct orders of Magneto several times. The alternative endings are: the re-opening of the Xavier Institute in which Beast is now a professor; Logan coming back to Alberta, Canada, specifically the very same tavern seen in the first X-Men; and Rogue keeping her powers.
 Wallace and Gromit: The Curse of the Were-Rabbit had two different endings. One had Lady Totington marrying PC Mackintosh and another had Lady Totington visiting Wallace and giving Gromit the golden carrot.
 Whisper: In the alternative ending, the kidnapper Max has chased the demon boy David through the forest David makes him believe the wolves around him are the people who died. When they turn into wolves, they attack Max, but instead of throwing the axe and hitting David, Max holds on to the axe as he falls and the wolves maul him to death. Afterwards, the cops show up and wrap David up in a blanket and take him to safety. As the police van leaves, you can see David smiling.
  Sailor of the King: two endings were filmed, one of which in which Jeffrey Hunter's character dies and one in which he is rescued.  Film audiences could vote on which ending they preferred.

Examples in television
In TV shows, producers may want to keep the ending of an episode a secret, even if it means keeping it from the stars themselves. In such a case, they will usually film more than one ending and not tell the cast which one will be used.
24: To keep the ending to Season 1 a surprise, the crew shot multiple endings to the finale (Teri's death was the one they aired). A second ending had Teri live through the gunshot, and a third had her not being shot at all, with the family embracing each other after the long day was over.
Crown Court: Granada series between 1972 and 1984 consisting of both legal drama and traditional court show set in a courtroom depicting fictionalised cases deliberated upon and given an unscripted verdict by a real jury from eligible members of the general public to which actors reacted to.
D.I.E: In original ending, Yue Sir (Roger Kwok) dies from a car accident and the audience wanted a happier ending so TVB created a new one in the style of mo lei tau comedy. In the new ending, the cast tries to stop the car accident that would kill Yue Sir from happening.
Do the Right Thing: BBC series 1994–1995 presented by Terry Wogan in which audience members decided moral and ethical dilemmas in fictionalised examples with only one of multiple prerecorded story endings broadcast.
E.U.: Due to the popularity of Michael Tse's character Laughing Gor, who died in episode 22, an ending was shot where Laughing changes into his police uniform and talks. The ending never implied whether Laughing is alive or not and leaves it open for the audience to decide.
Green Wing: In the final Special, Guy and Mac are dragged into the air in an attempt to rescue Caroline, who has been dragged into the air by holding too many helium balloons. Whilst in the air, Mac tells Caroline he has something to tell her. After walking into the sea, Alan and Joanna are last seen hanging onto a buoy, waiting to drown. The actors wanted to use this ending but it was turned down. It was thought that this ending would have been used if a third series was being made.
Sex and the City: In the series finale three endings were shot, in which Carrie Bradshaw: (1) becomes engaged to Aleksandr Petrovsky, (2) resumes her relationship with Mr. Big, and (3) turns down both suitors and reaffirms her love for her friends.
The Simpsons: In the two part episode "Who Shot Mr. Burns?" there was an alternative ending where it was revealed that the shooter of Mr. Burns was Waylon Smithers rather than Maggie Simpson. Shots of other characters shooting Mr. Burns were also fully animated, though no other complete ending scenes were produced. (These alternative shootings were intended to be intentionally 'leaked' as an elaborate practical joke on the media, but the producers could find no journalists who would take the bait.)
Lost: At the end of Season 4, the audience learns that one of the main characters will die in the future. To keep the identity of this person a secret, three different versions of the final scene were shot. The canonical ending shows that Locke will die, while the alternative endings had Sawyer and Desmond die.
Total Drama: For every season of this animated "reality show", 2 endings were filmed in which both finalists would win the competition. Every country Total Drama aired in got to decide which ending to air.
King of the Hill: Some episodes have alternative endings (including the episode "The Company Man"), which can be found on the DVD Special Features.
Psych: the episode "100 Clues", a parody of the board game Clue, had alternative endings where the fans decided  who was the culprit of murdering a guest at a party. Also, the episode "Right Turn or Left for Dead" involves the main character, Shawn, playing out an alternative ending to the episode in his head had events in the previous episode been slightly different.
Pretty Little Liars: In the episode, "The Lady Killer," three endings were shot, each revealing a member of the A-Team. Because the producers wanted to keep this member a secret from everyone (including the cast members), they shot three endings and did not tell anyone who the member of the A-Team was. Out of Paige's alternative ending, Caleb's ending, and Toby's ending, the producers ended up showing Toby's.
Secrets and Lies: In order to keep the real killer's identity secret until the end, several multiple endings were shot.
Breaking Bad: There is a small short that Bryan Cranston came up with before the ending of Breaking Bad about a man who wakes up in a different life completely telling his wife that he was a “world class meth dealer” the producers liked this idea and Gordon Smith wrote it. This alternative ending is about Hal and Lois from Malcolm in the Middle when Bryan Cranston's character Hal wakes up and tells Lois about every major character in breaking bad and their actions, calling Hank Schrader "the guy from The Shield". Lois tells Hal not to eat deep-fried Twinkies anymore, as they go back to sleep and the camera pans to Heisenberg's hat.
How I Met Your Mother: The alternative ending to HIMYM was made because all the fans disliked the original ending. The original ending was made a few seasons in but everyone seemed to love the show so the continued on with production, they filmed the original ending long before the show ended because the kids on the show would get older. This was probably the most anticipated and hated ending for people because the mother that had two seasons of real screen time and was hyped up throughout the whole show just to be killed off at the end. They created a second ending to please audiences and a lot of audiences believe the alternative ending to be the true ending to HIMYM. The alternative ending to HIMYM is that Tracy does not die but leaves almost everything the same.

Examples in music
English rock band Marillion's 1994 concept album Brave is one of the very few examples of an alternative ending appearing in the medium of music. The vinyl edition of Brave featured a double groove on side B of the second record, the final side of the album: depending on where the needle was dropped, the record would either play the standard track listing (the songs "The Great Escape" and "Made Again") or would instead play only an alternative version of "The Great Escape" with different lyrics, presenting an alternative, darker ending to the album's story.

Examples in video games

Many video games also have alternative endings. Since video games are an interactive medium, these endings are generally posed as a result of player action; such as completing the game in a harder difficulty, taking a different route through the game's storyline and succeeding or failing at given tasks. It is generally possible to play a game a second time, make different decisions or achieve a different degree of success, and arrive at a different ending than the first time, complicating the canonicity of the ending(s).

See also
 Deleted scene
 Multiple endings

References

Endings

Film and video terminology
Home video supplements